Oxygen Thief is an English solo musical project based in the city of Bristol. He has received national radio recognition and festival slots.

Musical career
Oxygen Thief began in 2006. He has supported Frank Turner, Mongol Horde, InMe, Johnny Foreigner, Chris T-T, and Tubelord and is a regular feature at Cheltenham's award-winning 2000 Trees Festival. He first appeared at the festival in 2008. He returned in 2009, 2010, 2011, 2013 and 2014. He was featured in the BBC Introducing in Bristol preview of the 2010 festival. His 2011 appearance at the festival was praised for delivering intensity in a serene setting.

2009 saw the release of a three-way split album, entitled Exclamation at Asterisk Hash, which features fellow solo acoustic performers Ben Marwood and Jim Lockey. The album was released on Broken Tail Records. All three artists toured together in support of the release and played together at the Walk the Line Festival in 2009.

A debut album entitled Destroy It Yourself was released on 9 May 2011, also on Broken Tail Records. The album was praised for its intensity, energy and songwriting. He has been interviewed on Tom Robinson's BBC 6 music show and on BBC Introducing in Bristol. He played the 2012 BBC Introducing stage at the T in the Park festival.

Having toured regularly with acts from their roster, Oxygen Thief signed to Xtra Mile Recordings, formed a three piece electric line-up, released two EPs and a second album.

Songwriter Barry Dolan formed a more traditional acoustic side-project in 2016 under the name "Non Canon" and released a self-titled album in that year on Xtra Mile Recordings.

Discography

Albums and EPs
Destroy It Yourself (9 May 2011, Broken Tail Records)
Accidents Do Not Happen, They Are Caused (9 December 2013, Xtra Mile Recordings)
One Day This Will All Be Fields (23 March 2014, Xtra Mile Recordings)
The Half-Life of Facts (16 June 2014, Xtra Mile Recordings)
Confusion Species (16 November 2018, Xtra Mile Recordings)

Split EPs
Exclamation at Asterisk Hash (2009, Broken Tail Records)

References

External links
 – official website
Broken Tail Records on MySpace
Xtra Mile Recordings website

English male singer-songwriters
English punk rock guitarists
English punk rock singers
Folk punk musicians